The 1993–94 Australian region cyclone season was a slightly above average Australian cyclone season. It was also an event in the ongoing cycle of tropical cyclone formation. It ran from 1 November 1993 to 30 April 1994. The regional tropical cyclone operational plan also defines a tropical cyclone year separately from a tropical cyclone season, and the "tropical cyclone year" ran from 1 July 1993 to 30 June 1994.

Tropical cyclones in this area were monitored by four Tropical Cyclone Warning Centres (TCWCs): the Australian Bureau of Meteorology in Perth, Darwin, and Brisbane; and TCWC Port Moresby in Papua New Guinea.

Seasonal Summary

Systems

Severe Tropical Cyclone Naomi 

Naomi was the first cyclone of the 1993/94 season. Forming early on 15 December 1993, the storm moved south and strengthened into a Category 3 before making landfall. There was moderate damage and a fishing boat was disabled during the storm. There were no deaths.

Severe Tropical Cyclone Rewa 

Cyclone Rewa formed on 26 December 1993. It looped around the Coral Sea for almost a month, crossed New Caledonia and the Solomon Island, and dissipated on 21 January. Rewa was the longest-lived South Pacific tropical cyclone on record, lasting 25 days, from 26 December to 21 January.

Tropical Cyclone Oscar 

Cyclone Oscar was a weak system, and only barely reached cyclone strength on 3 January 1994 for about a 12-hour period. It moved on a generally west-southwest course parallel to the Kimberley and Pilbara coasts.

Severe Tropical Cyclone Pearl-Farah 

On 11 January, a tropical low formed northwest of Broome, Western Australia. It was named Pearl a few hours later by the Bureau of Meteorology. The cyclone continued westward and reached a peak intensity of 155 km/h (100 mph). As the system moved west of 90°E, MFR took over warning responsibility on 18 January and renamed the cyclone Farah. At that time, MFR estimated winds of about 120 km/h (75 mph). After having moved westward due to a ridge to the south, Farah turned to the south upon entering the basin due to an approaching trough, which previously absorbed Edmea. High wind shear caused rapid weakening, and by 19 January, there was little remaining convection. The next day, Farah weakened to tropical depression status and turned to the southeast. The ridge built behind the trough, causing the depression to stall and drift northward, and by 22 February, Farah dissipated.

Severe Tropical Cyclone Quenton 

Tropical Cyclone Quenton began as a tropical low to the east of Christmas Island on 22 January 1994. The low moved slowly west, then on 25 January intensified to cyclone strength and moved southward across the Indian Ocean. By early on the 29th the cyclone had dissipated.

Tropical Cyclone Sadie 

During 29 January, the BoM reported that a tropical low had developed within the monsoon trough, to the north of the Gove Peninsula in the Northern Territory. During that day the low rapidly developed further as it moved south-eastwards, before early on 29 January the BoM's TCWC Darwin reported that the low had developed into a category 1 tropical cyclone and named it Sadie as the system started to move southwards. Later that day the JTWC initiated advisories on Cyclone Sadie and designated it as Tropical Cyclone 14P, while the system started to move towards the east and was near its peak 1-minute maximum sustained windspeeds of 85 km/h (50 mph). Early the next day Cyclone Sadie made landfall to the north of near Normanton, after the BoM had reported that the system had peaked with 10-minute maximum sustained winds of 85 km/h (50 mph). After making landfall, the system moved towards the south-southeast before weakening and degenerating into a tropical low/rain depression later that day.

Severe Tropical Cyclone Theodore 

Severe Tropical Cyclone Theodore existed from 22 to 28 February.

Severe Tropical Cyclone Sharon 

Tropical Cyclone Sharon was the most intense cyclone in the Western Australian region during the 1993/94 season. It formed about 1100 km north of Northwest Cape on 12 March 1994, then rapidly intensified during the 14th while moving on a south-southwest path towards the west Pilbara coast. During the 16th the cyclone rapidly weakened due to movement into a region of strong westerly wind shear. Cyclone warnings were issued for the west Pilbara and upper west coast on the 16th but were cancelled on the morning of the 17th Continued shearing and subsequent movement over cooler waters weakened the storm to below cyclone strength by the morning of the 18th.

Tropical Cyclone Tim 

Tropical Cyclone Tim was a very small weak system that moved on a generally westward path from south of Sumatra to the Cocos Islands from 28 March to 3 April 1994. It passed about 100 km to the south of Christmas Island but its effects, other than a wind shift, were barely recognizable on the Island.

Severe Tropical Cyclone Vivienne 

Tropical Cyclone Vivienne formed from a tropical low that had moved westward across the Timor Sea. It intensified rapidly during the afternoon and night of 5 April 1994, reaching maximum intensity on 8 April when it was located 550 km to the north-northwest of Broome. Its development from here on was hampered by vertical wind shear and Vivienne moved on a generally west-southwest path parallel to, but well offshore from, the Western Australian coastline. It dissipated on 13 April and no watches or warnings were issued.

Tropical Depression 29P 

During that day the disturbance moved towards the southeast and passed over several of the Solomon Islands, before emerging into the Australian basin. Over the next couple of days the disturbance gradually developed further while moving towards the southwest before re-curving and moving southeastwards. On 24 April, as it moved back into the South Pacific basin, the JTWC initiated advisories on the disturbance, designating it as Tropical Cyclone 29P, with peak windspeeds equivalent to a tropical depression. As the system was classified, it recurved again and started to move slowly towards the northwest, and started to feel the effects of a high amount of vertical windshear.

Tropical Cyclone Willy 

Willy was a Category 1 cyclone lasting from 26 April to 1 May 1994 that passed about 80 km west of the Cocos Islands.

Other systems 
During 23 March, a weak tropical low developed within the South Pacific Convergence Zone near Papua New Guinea's Louisiade Archipelago, within an area of favourable surface and upper air conditions for further development. Over the next day the system moved eastwards and gradually developed further, before TCWC Port Moresby reported that the system had developed into a category 1 tropical cyclone on the Australian scale and named it Usha during the next day before it moved into the South Pacific tropical cyclone basin.

Season effects 

|-
| Naomi || 14 – 18 December || bgcolor=#|Category 3 severe tropical cyclone || bgcolor=#| || bgcolor=#| || Western Australia ||  ||  ||
|-
| Rewa ||  || bgcolor=#|Category 5 severe tropical cyclone || bgcolor=#| || bgcolor=#| || Melanesia, Eastern Australia, New Zealand ||  || 22 ||
|-
| Oscar ||  || bgcolor=#|Category 1 tropical cyclone || bgcolor=#| || bgcolor=#| || Northern Territory, Western Australia ||  ||  ||
|-
| Pearl-Farah ||  || bgcolor=#|Category 3 severe tropical cyclone || bgcolor=#||| bgcolor=#| || Western Australia ||  ||  ||
|-
| Quenton ||  || bgcolor=#|Category 3 severe tropical cyclone || bgcolor=#||| bgcolor=#| || None ||  ||  ||
|-
| Sadie ||  || bgcolor=#| || bgcolor=#| || bgcolor=#| || Cape York ||  ||  ||
|-
| Unnamed ||  || bgcolor=#|Tropical Low || bgcolor=#| || bgcolor=#| || Western Australia ||  ||  ||
|-
| Theodore ||  || bgcolor=#|Category 5 severe tropical cyclone || bgcolor=#||| bgcolor=#| || Papua New Guinea, Solomon IslandsNew Caledonia || Unknown || 1 ||
|-
| Sharon ||  || bgcolor=#|Category 4 severe tropical cyclone || bgcolor=#||| bgcolor=#| || Western Australia ||  ||  ||
|-
| Tim ||  || bgcolor=#|Category 1 tropical cyclone || bgcolor=#| || bgcolor=#| || None ||  ||  ||
|-
| Vivienne ||  || bgcolor=#|Category 3 severe tropical cyclone || bgcolor=#||| bgcolor=#| || None ||  ||  ||
|-
| 29P ||  || bgcolor=#|Tropical Depression || bgcolor=#||| bgcolor=#| || Solomon Islands ||  ||  ||
|-
| Willy ||  || bgcolor=#| || bgcolor=#| || bgcolor=#| || Cocos Islands ||  ||  ||
|-

See also 

 List of Southern Hemisphere tropical cyclone seasons
 Atlantic hurricane seasons: 1994, 1994
 Pacific hurricane seasons: 1994, 1994
 Pacific typhoon seasons: 1993, 1994
 North Indian Ocean cyclone seasons: 1994, 1994

References 

 
Australian region cyclone seasons